Jefferson/USC station is an at-grade light rail station on the E Line of the Los Angeles Metro Rail system. The station is located alongside Flower Street at its intersection with Jefferson Boulevard, after which the station is named, along with the nearby University of Southern California (USC). The station also has nearby stops for the J Line of the Los Angeles Metro Busway system, southbound buses stop on Flower Street, across from the station and northbound buses stop on Figueroa Street, one block to the west. Jefferson/USC station serves the North University Park in neighborhood of Los Angeles.

The station is located across the street from the Galen Center, an indoor arena that is the home of the USC basketball and volleyball teams. During the 2028 Summer Olympics, the station will serve spectators traveling to and from venues located on the USC campus including Badminton at the Galen Center and the Media Village/Main Press Center at the University Village residential and retail center.

Service

Station layout

Hours and frequency

Connections 
, the following connections are available:
 LADOT DASH: F, King-East

Notable places nearby 
The station is within walking distance of the following notable places:
 Galen Center
 Shrine Auditorium
 University of Southern California

Station artwork 
The station's art was created by artist Samuel Rodriguez.  The installation, entitled "Urban Dualities" is a visual narrative that includes fragments of building facades, vintage rail cars, realistically rendered human figures, and fictional characters."

References 

E Line (Los Angeles Metro) stations
Railway stations in Los Angeles
University Park, Los Angeles
University of Southern California
Railway stations in the United States opened in 2012
Railway stations in California at university and college campuses
2012 establishments in California